Albin Jarić (born 1953), better known by his stage name Jimi Rasta, is a Bosnian–Slovenian musician, painter, and mineralogist.

Career 
Jarić is born in 1953 in Zenica, PR Bosnia and Herzegovina, FPR Yugoslavia. He started playing drums in the first year of high school when he won an audition for a school band. In 1976, he met Jamaican Brian and African Ken in a student settlement, both guitarists and singers with whom he founded reggae band Night Duty.

In Zenica, he finished high school and enrolled studies in metallurgy at the University of Zenica. After a year he continued his studies in Ljubljana at the Ljubljana Faculty of Natural Sciences and Engineering, Department of Mineralogy. Upon arrival in Ljubljana, Jarić devotes himself to the renovation of one basement in the Rožna Dolina student settlement, under the auspices of the student organization Forum. In a few years, this basement becomes the famous nightclub, Student Disco (later Disco FV, nowadays Club K-4). Jarić worked there as a disc jockey playing rock, reggae, dub, and worldbeat music.

Jarić was employed by the Institute of Metallurgy and Mining as a junior researcher until the breakup of Yugoslavia in 1991. In 1992, Jarić set up the band Planet People in Jamaica.

In 2001, Jarić joined the Bosnian garage rock band Zabranjeno Pušenje. He performed on their seventh studio album Bog vozi Mercedes (2001), as well as on a live album; Live in St. Louis (2004). As a percussionist, he performed on 350 concerts of Zabranjeno Pušenje. Jarić left the band in 2004 when he made a break from music career and became devoted to painting. As a percussionist, he has worked with a variety of bands, playing rock, punk, afrobeat, reggae, jazz, and all the way to Canadian country and the Balkan groove.

Discography 
Zabranjeno pušenje
 Bog vozi Mercedes (2001) 
 Live in St. Louis (2004)

References

External links
 Jimi Rasta Discography on Discogs

1953 births
Living people
Bosnia and Herzegovina emigrants to Slovenia
Slovenian mineralogists
Musicians from Zenica
Reggae musicians
Slovenian DJs
Slovenian musicians
Slovenian painters
Slovenian people of Bosnia and Herzegovina descent
University of Ljubljana alumni
Zabranjeno pušenje members
Date of birth missing (living people)